Elgin High School is a secondary school located within Comanche County in Elgin, Oklahoma.

Academics

Athletics
In 2001, Elgin High School set an Oklahoma 4A boys' track state meet record for the 800 meter run competition.
 
In, 2011, Elgin High School won boys' 4/A cross country state championship, ending a 42-year drought of no state titles for Elgin High School sports.
The only team title was the fall of 1969 baseball state championship.

In, 2012, Elgin High School Girls' Volleyball team won the school its first State Championship for any girls' team in school's history.

In 2013 Elgin Football made it to the 4A State playoffs. They made it to the first round. They repeated this again in Fall 2017, the first time they had done so in 4 years. They were beaten by Ada High School in the first round.

In the years 2014–2018, Elgin had a total of over 13 state qualifiers in OFBCA (Oklahoma Football Coaches Association) Powerlifting in 4A and 4 state placers. In 2016–17 there were a total of 10 qualifiers and 2018 only one qualified to state. These were their most successful powerlifting seasons to date.

Elgin had its first 3x state champion on their wrestling team in the 126–132 weight class in the years 2016–2018.

Elgin is known for their 5A Track and Field team as well. They produced state qualifiers and champions in the last 10 years, and had won many meets including 2017 western conference champs.

In, 2018, Elgin High School made history and won the 4/A baseball state championship. They set a new standard as they had not won a championship in over 60 years.

Clubs and organizations
Elgin High School sponsors the following clubs and organizations for the student body: Art Club, Choir/Vocal Music, Dance Team, Elgin High School Band, FCA (Fellowship of Christian Athletes), FCCLA (Family, Career and Community Leaders of America), FFA (Future Farmers of America), Key Club, Multicultural Club, National Art Honor Society, National Honor Society, Native American Club, Rodeo Team, Student Council, Technology Student Association.

Sources

Public high schools in Oklahoma
Schools in Comanche County, Oklahoma
1902 establishments in Oklahoma Territory